Shawford railway station serves the villages of Twyford, Compton and Shawford in Hampshire, England.

This station and all trains serving it are operated by South Western Railway.

Layout and facilities
The station has three platforms, two in the southbound direction. It previously had a goods yard, but this was closed and sold in the 1990s. The station is unstaffed.

Services
Shawford receives an hourly service in each direction on weekdays (with peak extras), with less frequent services on Saturdays and Sundays. The hourly Winchester to  stopping trains provide services between Monday and Saturdays off-peak, in other times trains between London Waterloo and  stops here.

Accidents and incidents
On 20 July 1952, a passenger train overran signals and was derailed by trap points. No-one was injured.

Appearances in media
The station was featured briefly in a 1974 film starring Sophia Loren, an unsuccessful and now little-seen remake of Brief Encounter.

In 2000, Shawford was used on the final episode of the BBC TV series One Foot in the Grave. The character Victor Meldrew is seen walking from the steps down from the station platform. He then stands in front of the station sign, waiting to be picked up, before being run over by a car.

References

External links

Railway stations in Hampshire
DfT Category F2 stations
Railway stations in Great Britain opened in 1882
Former London and South Western Railway stations
Railway stations served by South Western Railway